Ninety national pavilions participated in the 58th Venice Biennale, an international contemporary art exhibition held between May and November 2019. The Venice Biennale takes place biennially in Venice, Italy, and participating nations select artists to show at their pavilions, hosted in the Venice Giardini, Arsenale, and palazzos throughout the city. The 90 pavilions set a new record for national participation, exceeding the 86 from 2017. Highlight pavilions from the show included Lithuania, Ghana, France, the United States, the Philippines, India, Brazil, and Italy.

National pavilions

References

External links 

 

National pavilions
58th Venice Biennale